Sinbad or The Maid of Balsora is a musical with music composed by W. H. Batchelor and a book and lyrics by Harry B. Smith.

The original production opened on June 11, 1891, in Chicago and starred Eddie Foy.  It was produced by David Henderson, whose company was then known as the American Extravaganza Company.

Original cast
In order of appearance:
 Fanny Ward as Cupid
 Ida Mulle as Ninetta
 Louise Eissing as Sinbad
 Harry Norman as Snarleyow
 Herbert Gresham as Count Spaghetti
 Fanny Duball as School mistress
 Eddie Foy as Fresco
 Arthur Dunn as Old Man of the Sea

Songs
 "He Never Came Back"
 "That's What The Wild Waves Are Saying"
 "Money"
 "Lullaby of the Waves"
 "The Bogie Man"
 "Wedding Bells"
 "Oh! What a Diff'rence in the Morning" (interpolated by Frank Norman)
 Adieu' Said Marjorie"

Notes

References

1891 musicals